The Church of Virgin Mary of Braslaw is a Belarusian catholic church of the Roman Catholic Diocese of Vitebsk. The church was constructed in 1824 and rebuilt in 1897. It is an object of Belarusian architectural heritage.

History 

The first mentions of a catholic church on Zamkovaya Mountain in Braslaw refer to the early XV century. The church then was made of wood, during wars and military conflicts it was many times destroyed by fire, but always rebuilt. In 1794 during the Kościuszko Uprising the church was burned down by the Russian army. By 1824 it was rebuilt in stone.

By the end of the century the church no longer sufficed to the growing diocese that had more than 16000 Catholics. The church was rebuilt in Romanesque Revival style and consecrated in 1897. 

During the Hitler's occupation the church's pastor Mechislav Akreitz was shot by the Nazis for helping Jews.

In 1950 the church was closed and for two years its building was used as a grain storage. In 1952 the local Christian community managed to take it back and restore the original function.

In 2017 a new organ was installed in the church.

References

Landmarks in Belarus
Roman Catholic churches in Minsk